Sayyida Ahad bint Abdullah bin Hamad Al Busaidiyah (born 4 April 1970) is the wife of the Sultan of Oman, Haitham bin Tariq.

Early life 
She is the daughter of Sayyid Abdullah bin Hamad Al-Busaidi, a former Undersecretary for Justice in the Ministry of Justice, Awqaf, and Islamic Affairs and former Governor of Musandam.

Her sister Sayyida Rawdah bint Abdullah is married to Sayyid Shihab bin Tariq, the brother of the Sultan of Oman, and their daughter Sayyida Meyyan is married to the Crown Prince Sayyid Theyazin on 11 November 2021 in Mazay Hall of Al Alam Palace.

She has a degree in Sociology.

Marriage and children
Sayyida Ahad bint Abdullah and her husband, Sultan Haitham bin Tariq, have four children:

 Crown Prince Sayyid Theyazin bin Haitham (born 21 August 1990).
 Sayyid Bilarab bin Haitham (born 1995).
 Sayyida Thuraya bint Haitham.
 Sayyida Omaima bint Haitham.

Title and style
Ahad is styled: "Her Highness The Honourable Lady Sayyida Ahad Bint Abdullah Bin Hamad Al Busaidiyah".

References

Al Said dynasty
Omani royalty
Living people
1970 births